The discography of American country music singer–songwriter, Pam Tillis, contains 14 studio albums, six compilation albums, one video album, 45 singles, 25 music videos and has appeared on 11 albums. Tillis's career was launched on the Warner Bros. label, where she releases several unsuccessful singles and her debut studio album: Above and Beyond the Doll of Cutey (1983). Through Arista Nashville, her second studio album was released in January 1991 titled Put Yourself in My Place. The disc was her first commercial success, reaching number ten on America's Billboard Top Country Albums chart, number 69 on the Billboard 200 and number 12 on Canada's RPM country chart. The disc also certified gold in both countries and spawned five charting singles. Of these releases, "Don't Tell Me What to Do", "One of Those Things" and "Maybe It Was Memphis" reached the top ten of the Billboard Hot Country Songs chart. In September 1992, her third studio album was released called Homeward Looking Angel. The disc certified both gold and platinum in North America, while also spawning the Billboard and RPM top ten singles "Shake the Sugar Tree" and "Let That Pony Run".

In April 1994, Arista issued Sweetheart's Dance, which reached number six on the Billboard country albums chart and certified platinum in North America. Four of its five singles were top ten singles on either the Billboard or RPM country charts. Its third release, "Mi Vida Loca (My Crazy Life)", topped both the American and Canadian country songs charts. All of This Love was then issued in November 1995 and certified gold in the United States. Two of its singles reached the country top ten: "Deep Down" and "The River and the Highway". Her first compilation of Greatest Hits was released in July 1997 and certified platinum in the United States. Both of its new recordings were released as singles and reached the North American country top ten: "All the Good Ones Are Gone" and "Land of the Living". Arista Nashville issued two more of Tillis's studio albums: Every Time (1998) and Thunder & Roses (2001). Of its singles, only "I Said a Prayer" (1998) reached the top ten. Tillis then moved to independent labels for her future releases, beginning with It's All Relative: Tillis Sings Tillis. On her own Stellar Cat label, Tillis released several more studio albums, including RhineStoned (2007) and Looking for a Feeling (2020). Tillis also collaborated with Lorrie Morgan on two studio albums: Dos Divas (2013) and Come See Me and Come Lonely (2017).

Albums

Studio albums

Compilation albums

Singles

As lead artist

As a collaborative and featured artist

Videography

Video albums

Lead music videos

Featured music videos

Other appearances

Notes

References

Country music discographies
 
 
Discographies of American artists